In 2005 at Hiratsuka, Kanagawa Prefecture, Japan,  was murdered and her mother  (born July 17, 1951) was later convicted of killing her own daughter. Chizuko Okamoto was also suspected as a serial killer who might have killed at least four others, but was not charged. Asahi Shimbun described her mysterious incident as "house of horrors".

Background 
Chizuko Okamoto was born in Aomori Prefecture. She ran away from her first husband in 1975 and began a relationship with the man who would later become her common-law husband. Her first husband died in a tsunami on Okushiri Island in 1993.

Chizuko's six-year-old son, Toshihide, disappeared in 1984. She gave birth to two children in 1985 and 1987, but did not report their births. Her common-law husband died of illness in 1997. She began to insist that her disappeared son was abducted by agents of the North Korean government.

Murder and arrest 
At the time, Chizuko Okamoto lived with her 35-year-old stepson Minehiro Yamauchi and her 19-year-old daughter Rikako. Her daughter died in October 2005, and Yamauchi died in March 2006. Yamauchi's mother found the bodies of her son and Rikako in Okamoto's apartment in Hiratsuka, Kanagawa Prefecture on May 1, 2006. Upon investigation of the apartment, police discovered the remains of Toshihide and her two other newborns. The police also found a memo suggesting that Okamoto was the murderer, and, on May 3, 2006, she was arrested.

Controversy and trial 
The death of Minehiro Yamauchi was ruled a suicide. Autopsies performed on the bodies of the three children were inconclusive, and because the three-year statute of limitations on the crime of abandoning a corpse had passed, no charges relating to the children were pursued.

During the trial, Chizuko Okamoto insisted on her innocence and claimed that Minehiro had killed Rikako. Despite a lack of admissible physical evidence and witnesses, Okamoto was convicted. On July 23, 2007, the Yokohama District Court sentenced her to 12 years in prison for the murder of her daughter.

Chizuko Okamoto appealed the guilty verdict. Her appellate hearing commenced in the Tokyo High Court on May 8, 2008. The Tokyo High Court upheld her sentence on October 23, 2008.

See also 
Statute of limitations
Osaka child abandonment case

References

External links
Flat full of bodies; mom guilty of killing daughter Japan Times July 24, 2007
Son missing since '84 may be among bodies found in flat Japan Times May 5, 2006
Japanese Wikipedia entry on the incident case

Murder in Japan
Victims of serial killers
2005 murders in Japan